Rafael Teshiba Tulfo (born March 12, 1960), popularly known as Raffy Tulfo or Idol Raffy, is a Filipino politician, broadcast journalist, and media personality currently serving as a Senator of the Philippines since 2022. 

His works are focused on government and private sector issues, and he is best known as the host of the long-running public affairs radio program Wanted sa Radyo, and the former anchor of Aksyon sa Tanghali from 2014 to 2020 that featured the segment Ipa-Raffy Tulfo Mo. His YouTube channel Raffy Tulfo in Action, which features videos from both shows, is the third-most subscribed Filipino YouTube channel as of 2021. Tulfo sought a seat in the Philippine senate in the 2022 election and won placing third overall with 25 million votes. Tulfo serves as the Chairman of the Senate Committee on Energy and Senate Committee on Migrant Workers.

Biography 
Raffy Tulfo was born as Rafael Teshiba Tulfo in Quezon City on March 12, 1960. He is the son of Ramon Tulfo Sr., a colonel in the Philippine Constabulary, and Caridad Teshiba-Tulfo, a housewife. He is the eighth out of ten siblings which includes broadcasters Ramon, Ben, and Erwin as well as former tourism secretary Wanda Corazon Teo.

A college dropout, Tulfo spent four years in different universities and studied several majors including economics, political science, agribusiness and commerce but did not finish a degree before becoming a journalist.

On October 2, 2021, Tulfo filed his certificate of candidacy for senator as an independent candidate for the 2022 senatorial election. On February 8, 2022, he joined the senatorial slate of presidential candidate Manny Pacquiao.

Controversies 
In 1999, Tulfo wrote a series of articles in his Abante-Tonite column alleging anomalous and illegal activities by officials of the Bureau of Customs. Tulfo, together with publisher Allen Macasaet and managing editor Nicolas Quijano Jr., were charged with libel by customs lawyer Carlos So on April 12, 1999. On February 28, 2005, the Pasay City Regional Trial Court found Tulfo, Macasaet and Quiano guilty of 14 counts of libel and were sentenced to up to 32 years of imprisonment and ordered to pay a fine of  total. On June 29, 2021, the Supreme Court acquitted Tulfo of the libel charges.

On March 24, 2004, Tulfo published an article in his Abante-Tonite column accusing businessman Michael Guy of seeking help from former finance secretary Juanita Amatong to halt a tax fraud investigation by the Department of Finance’s Revenue Integrity Protection Service (RIPS). The claim was proven false, however, as the RIPS only investigates government officials and did not have jurisdiction over Guy. In July 2019, the Supreme Court upheld the conviction and increased the amount of damages needed to be paid.

In January 2007, Tulfo and his brothers Ramon and Erwin, each posted bail after a Quezon City Regional Trial Court judge issued warrants for their arrests following a libel complaint by then-first gentleman Mike Arroyo. The brothers have previously accused Arroyo of using his influence to force the government-sequestered station RPN to cancel their investigative news program Isumbong Mo: Tulfo Brothers. On July 16, 2007, the libel case against the brothers was dismissed.

In June 2014, Tulfo again posted bail for an arrest warrant issued by the Quezon City Regional Trial Court after Senior Police Officer III Abubakhar Manlangit filed a libel case against him and his brother Erwin. The policeman, who appeared in a November 15, 2011, episode of T3, also filed an MTRCB complaint against the brothers after being called a "thief" on air which contributed to a 20-day suspension of the program.

On April 18, 2022, Tulfo's Senate bid faced a disqualification case due his conviction for the crime of libel.

Personal life
Tulfo is married to Jocelyn Pua, the incumbent representative for ACT-CIS Partylist since 1993. They had two wedding ceremonies – at the Office of the Municipal Circuit Trial Court in Luna, Isabela on June 24, 1993 and at the Little Quiapo restaurant in Quezon City on January 20, 1995. Together, they have two children and one grandson.  His daughter Maricel (born 1992) also hosts his programs Wanted sa Radyo and Idol in Action. His son Ralph Wendell (born 1996) is the incumbent representative of the 2nd district of Quezon City since 2022.

Julieta Nacpil Licup claimed that she and Tulfo married on October 25, 1982 at a civil wedding in Capas, Tarlac with supporting evidence and they have one daughter named Grendy, born in 1984. In addition, Julieta also claimed that Tulfo left her when she was five months pregnant with their child because of a misunderstanding. Because they were not able to communicate with each other thereafter in 1984, Julieta thought that Tulfo was dead and filed paperwork within the Philippine courts with evidence of her attempts at finding him. The courts approved her petition to his presumptive death and she was able to remarry an American in 1992. As a result, Tulfo was sued for bigamy on June 10, 2019 as their marriage was not annulled. She also claimed that Tulfo also married another woman named Celedonia Amos in the United States in 1985. He also faced a disqualification case before Commission on Elections given those claims of his past marriages, but was later junked by the Commission's 2nd division because it "does not pertain to his qualification for elective office."

Filmography

Television

Radio

Notes

References

External links 
 
 

1960 births
Living people
Commentary YouTubers
Filipino television news anchors
Filipino radio journalists
Filipino actor-politicians
Filipino YouTubers
Independent politicians in the Philippines
TV5 (Philippine TV network) personalities
News5 people
News YouTubers
People from Davao City
People's Television Network
Raffy
Senators of the 19th Congress of the Philippines